Cappella de' Picenardi is a comune (municipality) in the Province of Cremona in the Italian region Lombardy, located about  southeast of Milan and about  east of Cremona.

One of the main churches is that of San Pancrazio Martire.

Cappella de' Picenardi borders the following municipalities: Ca' d'Andrea, Cicognolo, Derovere, Pescarolo ed Uniti, Pessina Cremonese, Pieve San Giacomo, Torre de' Picenardi.

References

Cities and towns in Lombardy